Lawrence Edward Luscombe OStJ (10 November 1924 – 3 May 2022) was a British Anglican bishop and author. He was Bishop of Brechin from 1975 to 1990 and primus of the Scottish Episcopal Church from 1985 to 1990.

Early life and education
Luscombe was educated at Torquay Boys' Grammar School, an all-boys state grammar school in Torquay, Devon. He studied at King's College London and Kelham Theological College.

Career

Early career
Luscombe served in the Indian Army between 1942 and 1945. On 19 March 1944, he was granted an emergency commission as a second lieutenant. On 1 August 1945, he transferred to the Devonshire Regiment of the British Army with the rank of war substantive lieutenant.

Luscombe became an associate of the Institute of Chartered Accountants (ACA) in 1952 and worked as a chartered accountant until 1963.

Ordained ministry
Luscombe was ordained in the Scottish Episcopal Church as a deacon in 1963 and as a priest one year later in 1964. His ecclesiastical career began as a curate at St Margaret's Glasgow after which he was rector of St Barnabas' Paisley. From 1971 to 1975 he was provost of St Paul's Cathedral, Dundee.

In 1975, Luscombe was consecrated a bishop and appointed the 50th Bishop of Brechin. Ten years later he was additionally elected the Primus of the Scottish Episcopal Church, a post he held until his retirement in 1990.

Academic career
After retiring, he became an academic and author. He earned an MPhil and PhD research degrees from the University of Dundee where he remained an honorary research fellow in modern history.

Personal life and death
Luscombe died on 3 May 2022, at the age of 97, after a long illness.

Honours
In May 1981, Luscombe was appointed a Serving Brother of the Venerable Order of St John (SBStJ). In January 1986, he was promoted to Officer of the Venerable Order of St John (OStJ). In 1987 he was awarded the honorary degree of Doctor of Laws (LLD) by the University of Dundee.

Selected works
Matthew Luscombe, Missionary Bishop, 1992
A Seminary of Learning, 1994
"The Scottish Episcopal Church in the 20th Century, 1996
Episcopacy in an Angus Glen, 2003
Steps into Freedom, 2004
Hands Across the Sea, 2006

References
 

1924 births
2022 deaths
People educated at Torquay Boys' Grammar School
Alumni of King's College London
Alumni of the University of Dundee
Provosts of St Paul's Cathedral, Dundee
Bishops of Brechin (Episcopalian)
20th-century Scottish Episcopalian bishops
20th-century Anglican archbishops
Primuses of the Scottish Episcopal Church
Officers of the Order of St John
British people in colonial India
Indian Army personnel of World War II
British Indian Army officers
Devonshire Regiment officers
20th-century British Army personnel